Ohmer Mountain is a  mountain in the Adirondack Mountains of New York. It is located northeast of Northville in Saratoga County.

History
In October 1911, the Conservation Commission built a wood fire lookout tower on the mountain. The tower ceased fire lookout operations in 1916, as arrangements couldn't be made to continue to maintain it. In 1917, a steel fire lookout tower was constructed on Hadley Mountain to replace the wood tower on Ohmer Mountain.

References

Mountains of Saratoga County, New York
Mountains of New York (state)